There are a number of parks and gardens in the city of Chernihiv, Ukraine.

Parks in Chernihiv
Dytynets Park
 Park Miskyi Sad
 Marin Hai Park
 Yalivshchyna Regional Landscape Park
 Bohdan Khmelnytskyi Garden

References

Parks and gardens in Chernihiv
Buildings and structures in Chernihiv
Tourist attractions in Chernihiv Oblast
Chernihiv